The United States Air Force's 435th Air Expeditionary Wing (435 AEW) is an air expeditionary unit assigned to the Third Air Force stationed at Ramstein Air Base, Germany. The Wing has forward deployed units in six locations in West and East Africa. Its command staff is also exercising command of the 435th Air Ground Operations Wing.

Among the missions conducted or supported by the 435th are medical evacuation, logistics support, ISR and aerial refueling. For its ISR mission, the Wing utilizes MQ-9 Reaper drones, having the US Air Force's only active-duty MQ-9 unit deployed to the region under its command.

Units
The 435th Air Expeditionary Wing is currently made up of two groups, which in turn consist of ten squadrons:
 409th Air Expeditionary Group (409 AEG) (Nigerien Air Base 201, Niger)
 324th Expeditionary Reconnaissance Squadron (324 ERS) (Naval Air Station Sigonella, Italy)
 409th Expeditionary Security Forces Squadron (409 ESFS)
 724th Expeditionary Air Base Squadron (724 EABS)
 768th Expeditionary Air Base Squadron (768 EABS) (Nigerien Air Base 101, Niger)
 449th Air Expeditionary Group (449 AEG) (Camp Lemonnier, Djibouti)
 12th Expeditionary Special Operations Squadron (12 ESOS) (Chabelley Airfield, Djibouti)
 75th Expeditionary Airlift Squadron (75 EAS)
 82nd Expeditionary Rescue Squadron (82 ERQS)
 475th Expeditionary Air Base Squadron (475 EABS) (Manda Bay Airfield, Kenya)
 726th Expeditionary Air Base Squadron (726 EABS)
 776th Expeditionary Air Base Squadron (776 EABS) (Chabelley Airfield, Djibouti)

References

Air expeditionary wings of the United States Air Force